Landkreis Namslau was a district in Prussian Silesia, from 1742 to 1945. The district capital was at Namslau. Today, the territory of the district is located in the Polish Opole Voivodeship.

History 
After conquering most of Silesia, King Frederick the Great introduced Prussian administrative structures in Lower Silesia by cabinet order on 25 November 1741. This included the establishment of two war and domain chambers in Breslau and Glogau as well as their subdivision into districts and the appointment of district administrators on 1 January 1742.

The district became part of the Province of Silesia in 1815, as part of Regierungsbezirk Breslau. On 8 November 1919 the Free State of Prussia dissolved the Province of Silesia and the Namslau district became part of the new Province of Lower Silesia, which was formed from Regierungsbezirk Breslau and Regierungsbezirk Liegnitz. With the entry into force of the Treaty of Versailles on 10 January 1920, parts of the district including the town of Reichthal and the surrounding rural communities became part of Poland. In January 1945, the Red Army captured the area of the Namslau district and in April, it was placed under the administration of Poland.

Demographics 
The district had a mixed population of Germans and Poles.

References

Namslau
Namysłów County
1742 establishments in Prussia
1945 disestablishments in Germany